Keechi Creek is a stream in Palo Pinto County, Texas. It originates two miles east of Graford, and empties into the Brazos River northwest of Mineral Wells.

See also
List of rivers of Texas

References

USGS Geographic Names Information Service
USGS Hydrologic Unit Map - State of Texas (1974)

Rivers of Texas
Rivers of Palo Pinto County, Texas